Eldonta Osborne (born August 12, 1967) is a former American football linebacker. He played for the Phoenix Cardinals in 1990 and for the Shreveport Pirates from 1994 to 1995.

References

1967 births
Living people
American football linebackers
Louisiana Tech Bulldogs football players
Phoenix Cardinals players
Shreveport Pirates players
People from Jonesboro, Louisiana
Players of American football from Louisiana